The 38th Cuban National Series saw Santiago de Cuba, which qualified for the playoffs, win three close series to take its first title in ten years.

Standings

Group A

Group B

Group C

Group D

Playoffs

References

 (Note - text is printed in a white font on a white background, depending on browser used.)

Cuban National Series seasons
Base
Base
Cuba
1998 in baseball